C/1999 S4 (LINEAR) was a long-period comet discovered on September 27, 1999, by LINEAR.

It came to perihelion on July 26, 2000, at a distance of 0.765 AU from the Sun.

The comet nucleus was estimated to be about 0.9 km in diameter. Before the comet broke up, the (dust and water) nucleus erosion rate was about 1 cm per day. The comet brightened near July 5, 2000, and underwent a minor fragmentation event.
The comet brightened again around July 20, 2000, and then disintegrated. The published optical and most radio data support that the main nuclear decay started July 23, 2000. Other comets are known to have disappeared, but Comet LINEAR is the first one to have been caught in the act.

The orbit of a long-period comet is properly obtained when the osculating orbit is computed at an epoch after leaving the planetary region and is calculated with respect to the center of mass of the solar system. Using JPL Horizons, the barycentric orbital elements for epoch 2010-Jan-01 generate a semi-major axis of 700 AU, an aphelion distance of 1400 AU, and a period of approximately 18,700 years.

References

External links 
 Orbital simulation from JPL (Java) / Horizons Ephemeris
 C/1999 S4 ( LINEAR ) – Seiichi Yoshida @ aerith.net
 C/1999 S4 (LINEAR) – Gary W. Kronk
 Hubble Sees Comet Linear Blow its Top STScI-2000-26 (7 July 2000)
 Hubble Discovers Missing Pieces of Comet Linear STScI-2000-27 (5 August 2000)
 The VLT Observes Comet LINEAR's "Shower" (6 August 2000)
 Comet LINEAR continues to disintegrate and could disappear completely within a few days (31 July 2000)

Hyperbolic comets
19990927
Destroyed comets